Frank Ronan (born in May 1963 in New Ross, County Wexford) is a novelist. He also writes a monthly column for Gardens Illustrated magazine. His novels have won numerous prizes including the 1989 Irish Times/Aer Lingus prize.

Works
 The Men Who loved Evelyn Cotton (1989)
 Picnic in Eden (1991)
 The Better Angel (1993)
 Dixie Chicken (1994)
 Lovely (1995)
 Handsome Men Are Slightly Sunburnt (1996)
 Home (2002)

References

1963 births
Living people
Irish gay writers
Irish columnists
20th-century Irish novelists
Irish LGBT novelists
Irish male novelists
21st-century Irish novelists